"If You Ever Leave Me" is a vocal duet between American singers Barbra Streisand and Vince Gill. The song was written by Richard Marx, and produced by Marx and David Foster. It first appeared as a song on Streisand's twenty-eighth studio album, A Love Like Ours (1999), and was released as an international CD single that included three additional tracks, two of which were recorded during the A Love Like Ours sessions but were not included on the album. The song later was included on Streisand's Duets album, released in 2002.

Critical reception
The song was well received among music critics. J.D. Considine from The Baltimore Sun described it as "pop-oriented fare", that "offers an impressive emotional depth." Chuck Taylor from Billboard declared it as a "luscious power ballad", noting that "it's hard to imagine a better combination of mature voices than that on this tantalizing song about needing to spend every minute with the one you love". He also felt that "thanks to silken production from Marx and David Foster, this one ranks up there with classics like 'Comin' In And Out Of Your Life' and 'Woman In Love'". An editor from Drogheda Independent commented, "The it Vince Gill meets the technical precision of Barbra Streisand. Magic. Two singers from very different genres come together for the duet of the year." The editor concluded, that "this is a beautiful love song that gets better the more you play it." People Magazine stated in their review of A Love Like Ours, that songs like "If You Ever Leave Me" "stand out simply because they don't drip with sentimentality and because Streisand allows a bit of blues to creep into her vocals."

Chart performance
"If You Ever Leave Me" was released to country radio and peaked at number 62 on the US Billboard Hot Country Singles & Tracks chart. On December 5, 1999, its accompanying music video became the third most played video on CMT. It also peaked at number 26 in the UK and number 92 in Australia.

Production
 Producers and arrangers: David Foster and Richard Marx
 Orchestra arranger and conductor: William Ross (composer)
 Engineer: Felipe Elgueta and Humberto Gatica
 Mixer: Mick Guzauski
 Mastering: Vlado Meller at Sony Music Studios, Santa Monica, CA
 Executive Producers: Barbra Streisand and Jay Landers

Track listing

Charts

References

Barbra Streisand songs
Vince Gill songs
1999 songs
1990s ballads